Olafur Magnússon (born 1939) is an Icelandic chess player, Icelandic Chess Championship two times winner (1970, 1973).

Biography
From the begin 1960s to the mid-1970s Olafur Magnússon was one of the leading Icelandic chess players. He twice won Icelandic Chess Championships: in 1970 after play-off against Ingvar Ásmundsson (4:2) and in 1973 after play-off against Magnús Sólmundarson (5:4).

Olafur Magnússon played for Iceland in the Chess Olympiads:
 In 1960, at fourth board in the 14th Chess Olympiad in Leipzig (+3, =5, -8),
 In 1970, at fourth board in the 19th Chess Olympiad in Siegen (+3, =5, -2),
 In 1972, at second reserve board in the 20th Chess Olympiad in Skopje (+5, =4, -2).

References

External links

Olafur Magnússon chess games at 365chess.com

1939 births
Living people
Icelandic chess players
Chess Olympiad competitors
20th-century chess players